Delhi Book or Delhie Book titled Reminiscences of Imperial Delhi is a collection of paintings done in Company style, commissioned by Sir Thomas Metcalfe in 1844. It contains 120 paintings by Indian artists, mainly by Mughal painter, Mazhar Ali Khan. The book was bought by the British Library in London.

History
It was commissioned by Sir Thomas Metcalfe, Governor-General's Agent at the Imperial court of the Mughal Emperor, Bahadur Shah Zafar. The paintings, done by Mughal painter, Mazhar Ali Khan, document the lifestyle of the last Mughal in 19th century Delhi. 

The book containing the paintings was sent to England for Metcalfe's daughter, Emily.

The book
The Delhi Book is an album consisting of 89 folios with approximately 130 paintings by Indian artists. The paintings depict Mughal and pre-Mughal monuments of Delhi, the lives of native Indians, and other contemporary material. Metcalfe added extensive descriptions to almost all paintings and bound them into a book. He had assembled the album as a gift for his daughter Emily, who at the time in 1844 lived in England. The book shows buildings as they were before the siege of Delhi during the Indian Mutiny. Many of these structures were razed, vandalized, or suffered neglect in the years following the Mutiny.

References

Mughal art
British Library collections
Delhi
1844 books
19th-century Indian books